Steatogenys elegans, the barred knifefish, is a species of Hypopomidae (bluntnose knifefishes) found in tropical South America. It is the type species of its genus. It is an electric fish found in a wide range of freshwater habitats in the Amazon, Orinoco and Essequibo river basins. It reaches almost  in total length.

References 

Hypopomidae
Weakly electric fish
Fish of Bolivia
Freshwater fish of Brazil
Freshwater fish of Colombia
Freshwater fish of Ecuador
Fish of Guyana
Freshwater fish of Peru
Fish of Venezuela
Fish of the Amazon basin
Fish described in 1880
Taxa named by Franz Steindachner